The National Red games, shortened as Red games or sometimes referred to internationally as Communist Olympics is a national sporting competition that began within the People's Republic of China under the Chinese Communist Party (CCP). The city and people participating varies depending on the games.

List of games

Sports
The competition events vary depending on the games.  Below are listing of some of the sports.

 Grenade throws
 100m thread spin
 240m obstacle course
 barb wire crawls
 minefield run
 Cart pushing 
 medic stretcher race
 patriotic sprints
 heroic suicide bombing (inspired by Dong Cunrui)

See also
 2008 Summer Olympics

References

National multi-sport events
Multi-sport events in China